The Fake Life is a 2022 Philippine television drama series broadcast by GMA Network. Directed by Adolf Alix Jr., it stars Beauty Gonzalez, Ariel Rivera and Sid Lucero. It premiered on June 6, 2022 on the network's Afternoon Prime line up replacing Artikulo 247. The series concluded on September 23, 2022 with a total of 79 episodes. It was replaced by Nakarehas na Puso in its timeslot.

Cast and characters
Lead cast
 Beauty Gonzalez as Cindy Villamor
 Ariel Rivera as Onats Villamor
 Sid Lucero as Mark Santiaguel

Supporting cast
 Will Ashley as Peter Luna
 Shanelle Agustin as Jaycie Villamor
 Carlos Dala as Jonjon Villamor
 Tetchie Agbayani as Sonya De Guzman
 Faye Lorenzo as Jai
 Jenny Miller as Dra. Margaux Nova
 Rina Reyes as Jean Luna
 Saviour Ramos as Caloy Luna
 Bryan Benedict as Benedict

Guest cast
 Bea Binene as young Cindy
 Jake Vargas as young Mark
 Kristofer Martin as young Onats
 Candy Pangilinan as young Sonya
 Michael Rivero as Ernesto Luna

Production
Principal photography commenced in March 2022.

Episodes
<onlyinclude>
<onlyinclude>

References

External links
 
 

2022 Philippine television series debuts
2022 Philippine television series endings
Filipino-language television shows
GMA Network drama series
Philippine romance television series
Television shows set in the Philippines